Cían mac Máelmuaid was a son of Máel Muad mac Brain, who was twice King of Munster. Cían's father had been killed by Brian Boru at the Battle of Belach Lechta. He was a member of Uí Echach Muman or Eóganacht Raithlind.

Cían became a close ally of Brian, allegedly marrying his daughter Sadb, according to late traditions. He had a son, Mathghamhain mac Cian who died at the Battle of Clontarf in 1014.

Notes

References

 Green, Alice Stopford, History of the Irish State to 1014. London: Macmillan. 1925.
 Ó Corráin, Donnchadh, Ireland Before the Normans. Gill and Macmillan. 1972.
 O'Donovan, John (ed. & tr.), Annala Rioghachta Eireann. Annals of the Kingdom of Ireland by the Four Masters. 7 vols. Dublin: Royal Irish Academy. 1848–51. 2nd edition, 1856. Volume II
 O'Mahony, John, "A History of the O'Mahony septs of Kinelmeky and Ivagha", in Journal of the Cork Historical and Archaeological Society, Volumes 12–16, Second Series. 1906–1910.
 Ó Murchadha, Diarmuid, Family Names of County Cork. Cork: The Collins Press. 2nd edition, 1996.
 Todd, James Henthorn (ed. & tr.). Cogadh Gaedhel re Gallaibh: The War of the Gaedhil with the Gaill. London: Longmans. 1867.
 
 O'Brien, John and John Conry, Dublin Annals of Inisfallen (see O'Donovan)

10th-century Irish monarchs
Kings of Munster
11th-century Irish people
10th-century Irish people